Thomas Howard, 16th Earl of Suffolk, 9th Earl of Berkshire FSA (18 August 1776 – 4 December 1851) was a British peer and politician.

Background

Suffolk was the second but eldest surviving son of General John Howard, 15th Earl of Suffolk, and Julia, daughter of John Gaskarth of Hutton Hall, Penrith, Cumberland. He gained the courtesy title Viscount Andover on the death of his elder brother, Charles Nevinson, who was killed by the accidental discharge of his fowling piece in 1800.

Political career
Suffolk was Member of Parliament for Arundel from 1802 to 1806. He was appointed Major-Commandant of the Malmesbury Volunteers by commission dated 15 Dec. 1803. In 1820 he succeeded his father in the two united earldoms of Suffolk and Berkshire and entered the House of Lords. In politics, his Lordship was a liberal Whig, and he voted for the Reform Bill on the decisive division of 14 April 1832. He was not a Protectionist, though a distinguished agriculturist. His appearance and usual costume was that of an ordinary farmer.

Family
Lord Suffolk married the Hon. Elizabeth Jane, daughter of James Dutton, 1st Baron Sherborne and Elizabeth Coke, in 1803. Elizabeth Jane was a double first cousin to Jane Elizabeth Coke, the former wife of Charles Nevinson Howard, Viscount Andover, and thus the niece of agricultural reformer Thomas William Coke, 1st Earl of Leicester and his wife Jane Dutton. She died in April 1836, aged 60. They had ten children:

Lady Elizabeth Howard (6 November 1803 – 20 July 1845), married her first cousin James Dutton, 3rd Baron Sherborne and had issue
Charles Howard, 17th Earl of Suffolk (07 Nov 1804–14 Aug 1876)
Captain Hon. Henry Thomas Howard (16 November 1808 – 29 January 1851)
Jane Elizabeth Howard (25 July 1809 – 28 July 1861), married Sir John Ogilvy, 9th Baronet
 Hon John Howard (4 April 1811 – 14 April 1823) killed in a sporting accident at Charterhouse School, Surrey
Hon. Richard Edward Howard (29 Jul 1812–27 February 1873), barrister
Hon. James Kenneth Howard (05 Mar 1814–7 January 1882)
Lady Mary Rose Howard (11 Sep 1815-22 May 1874)
Lady Frances Margaret Howard (14 Jan 1817-11 Nov 1894)

Lord Suffolk survived his wife by 15 years and died in December 1851, aged 75. He was succeeded by his eldest son, Charles.

References

External links

1776 births
1851 deaths
Thomas
Thomas
Members of the Parliament of the United Kingdom for English constituencies
UK MPs 1802–1806
Suffolk, E16
Thomas Howard, 16th Earl of Suffolk
Alumni of Christ Church, Oxford
Deputy Lieutenants of Wiltshire